Deltic may refer to:

 Napier Deltic, a diesel engine
 British Rail DP1 ("Deltic") a prototype locomotive built by English Electric fitted with the Deltic Engine
 British Rail Class 55, production locomotives powered by Deltic engines
 British Rail Class 23, "Baby Deltic" production locomotives powered by Deltic engines
 Deltic Preservation Society
 Deltic acid, a chemical whose molecular backbone resembles the Greek letter delta (Δ)

See also
 Deltics, a music album by Chris Rea
 Deltoid (disambiguation)
 Deltate (disambiguation)
 River delta
 Delta (letter)